$40 a Day was a Food Network show hosted by Rachael Ray. In each episode, Ray takes a one-day trip to an American, Canadian, or European city with only $40 US, to spend on food. While touring the city, she finds restaurants to go to (often based on local recommendations), and usually manages to fit three meals and some sort of snack or after-dinner drink into her small budget.

The show premiered on April 1, 2002, five months after the debut of 30 Minute Meals, making it her second show on the Food Network. Some clips are sometimes used in Ray's later series, Rachael Ray's Tasty Travels. Another Food Network series, Giada's Weekend Getaways starring Giada De Laurentiis, is similar in format. In 2010, The Travel Channel began airing reruns of the show. As of 2013, the show is no longer in reruns on the Travel Channel.

Details
According to Ray, visiting a fast food restaurant, particularly those of national chains, is considered cheating (she says so explicitly in the Orlando episode). On occasion, smaller sit-down restaurant chains (such as Bahama Breeze in the Las Vegas episode, or Bongos in the South Beach episode) are visited. Generally, non-food items and non-food-related activities are not included in her budget.

Ray always offers tips on what to see in the various cities, as well as hints on how to save money and find bargains while traveling. She also emphasizes researching whatever city she plans to visit through the Internet and asking the local citizens for their recommendations.

Initially, Ray only used item prices against her $40 limit. She started including applicable taxes and tips during the first season. On occasion, she does go over budget; however, during her trips to Philadelphia and Arizona, she did so on purpose. Her cheapest day was in Vancouver, British Columbia, in 2003, when she spent just under $25 USD including taxes and tips (at the time, less than $40 Canadian, although she budgeted for $40 USD). On occasions, she has had to get creative to stay on-budget; for example, she accidentally blew half her budget on her second meal in her first Miami episode.

The pilot, shot in Los Angeles, had a 12-hour limit, but subsequent episodes raised it to 24 hours. Usually episodes begin in the morning with breakfast, occasionally brunch. Episodes almost always feature four paid meals, but on at least one occasion, in the Research Triangle (Raleigh-Durham-Chapel Hill, NC), she did five meals. Also on rare occasion, only three meals are paid, and a fourth ends up being free. On only one occasion, in Antigua, she partook of a hotel's free Continental breakfast, but she still did four paid meals in that episode.

On her first visit to Las Vegas during the first season, Ray began with dinner and stayed overnight, ending with breakfast.

She did several episodes in Europe when the euro was still valued less than the U.S. dollar. She has not visited Europe since the U.S. dollar has fallen under the euro in value. She has also visited several island locales, including Bermuda and Antigua, both of which generally accept the U.S. dollar.

Ray has occasionally drawn controversy when some meals end up calculating with less-than-traditional tips.

Episodes

Season 1 (2002–03)

Season 2 (2003–04)

Season 3 (2004–05)

Season 4 (2005–06)

References

External links
 
 

2002 American television series debuts
2005 American television series endings
Food Network original programming
Food travelogue television series
English-language television shows